Percy Creek is a stream in the Regional District of Central Kootenay in the Kootenays Region of British Columbia, Canada. It is part of the Columbia River drainage basin, and is a right tributary of the Slocan River and is thus in the Slocan Valley.

Course
Percy Creek begins at unnamed slope and flows east to its mouth at the Slocan River at the community of Appledale. The Slocan River flows via the Kootenay River to the Columbia River.

References

See also
List of rivers of British Columbia

Rivers of British Columbia
Slocan Valley